Chris Cissell is an American soccer coach born May 6, 1972, in Dallas, Texas, United States. He is the current Head Coach of the women's soccer team at Grand Canyon University.

In 2003 Cissell guided the WJC women's soccer team to the NAIA National Final Four (his fifth year as the WJC women's head coach). In 2006 Cissell guided the WJC men's soccer team to the NAIA National Final Four (his fifth year as the WJC men's head coach). In 2006 Cissell was named NSCAA/adidas NAIA men's soccer National Coach of the Year. In 2010 Cissell guided the William Jewell College women's team to the National Elite Eight and the William Jewell College men's team to the National Final Four.

Early soccer experiences 
Chris Cissell has been involved in competitive soccer since age 8 and involved as a coach in the Kansas City club soccer scene since his sophomore year of college (1991). Although born in Dallas, Texas; Cissell grew up in St. Louis, Missouri and played club soccer for the legendary Pat McBride. At Parkway West high school, Cissell was co-captain with Brian Kamler who went on to play in MLS for 10 seasons. He also played against former Kansas City Wizards midfielders Matt McKeon and Mike Sorber and current MLS and U.S. National Team star winger Steve Ralston.

Coaching college soccer 
Guiding the William Jewell College women's program since 1999 and the men's program since 2002, Cissell has established himself as one of the most versatile and decorated coaches in the nation. In a short amount of time he has led the women's program to four women's NAIA National Tournament appearances (2003, 2004, 2005, 2007) and two men's NAIA National Tournament appearance (2004 & 2006). In addition, Cissell is the only coach in NAIA history to lead both a women's team (2003) and men's team (2006) to a NAIA National Tournament Final Four appearance. Since Cissell's arrival, William Jewell College soccer programs have become staples in the NSCAA National Rankings and regularly produce All Americans and nationally recognized scholar athletes.

A standout player at William Jewell College (1990–94), Cissell has also become a well-recognized coach earning the Heart of America Conference Women's Coach of the Year honor four times (2000, 2001, 2003, 2005) as well as NAIA Region V Women's Coach of the Year award in 2003 as well as NSCAA/adidas Midwest Coach of the Year in 2003. In addition, Coach Cissell earned the Heart of America Conference Men's Coach of the Year honor in 2003, 2006 & 2010 and was the recipient of the NAIA Region V Men's Coach of the Year honor in 2006 and the NSCAA/adidas Central Region Coach of the Year in 2006. At the 2006 National Soccer Coaches Association of America convention in Indianapolis, Indiana; Coach Cissell was honored as the 2006 NSCAA/adidas NAIA Men's National Coach of the Year. 
Coach Chris Cissell has a combined 279-92-21 record. He is 165-43-11 with the William Jewell College Women's soccer program and 114-49-10 with the William Jewell College Men's soccer program. Chris now lives in Liberty Missouri. He is Married and has four children one of which played on one of the best 14U national teams in America.

Honors

 Heart of America Athletic Conference Men's Coach of the Year-William Jewell College (2010)
 NSCAA Team Ethics Award-William Jewell College women's soccer (2010)
 Champions-Heart of America Athletic Conference-William Jewell College men's soccer (2010)
 NSCAA/adidas Team Academic Award-William Jewell College men's soccer (2010)
 NSCAA/adidas Team Academic Award-William Jewell College women's soccer (2010)
 NSCAA/adidas Team Academic Award-William Jewell College men's soccer (2009)
 NSCAA/adidas Team Academic Award-William Jewell College women's soccer (2009)
 NSCAA/adidas Team Academic Award-William Jewell College men's soccer (2008)
 NSCAA/adidas Team Academic Award-William Jewell College women's soccer (2008)
 NSCAA Team Ethics Award-William Jewell College women's soccer (2008)
NSCAA/adidas Team Academic Award-William Jewell College men's soccer (2007)
NSCAA/adidas Team Academic Award-William Jewell College women's soccer (2007)
 MLS SUM U17 Cup Finalist in Denver, Colorado-Kansas City Wizards Juniors (2007)
 NAIA National Tournament qualifiers-William Jewell College women's soccer (2007)
 NAIA Regional Tournament qualifiers-William Jewell College women's soccer (2007)
 NAIA National Tournament Final Four-William Jewell College men's soccer (2006)
 NAIA National Tournament qualifiers-William Jewell College men's soccer (2006)
 Champions-NAIA Region V Tournament-William Jewell College men's soccer (2006)
 NAIA Regional Tournament qualifiers-William Jewell College men's soccer (2006)
 NAIA Regional Tournament qualifiers-William Jewell College women's soccer (2006)
 Champions-Heart of America Athletic Conference-William Jewell College men's soccer (2006)
 NSCAA/adidas NAIA Men's National Coach of the Year (2006)
 NSCAA/adidas NAIA Men's Central Region Coach of the Year-William Jewell College (2006)
 Heart of America Athletic Conference Men's Coach of the Year-William Jewell College (2006)
 Heart of America Athletic Conference Women's Coach of the Year-William Jewell College (2005)
 NSCAA/adidas NAIA Women's Midwest Region Coach of the Year (2003)
 Heart of America Athletic Conference Men's Coach of the Year-William Jewell College (2003)
 NAIA National Tournament Final Four-William Jewell College women's soccer (2003)
 Heart of America Athletic Conference Women's Coach of the Year-William Jewell College (2003)
 Heart of America Athletic Conference Women's Coach of the Year-William Jewell College (2001)
 Heart of America Conference Women's Coach of the Year-William Jewell College (2000)

Soccer Administrator and Leader 

 Chris Cissell served as the Wizards Juniors Youth Director when the Kansas City Wizards (MLS) launched their youth teams in the summer of 2007. Cissell also assisted the 90/91 KC Wizards Juniors during their SUM U17 Cup in Denver, Colorado in 2007.
Chris Cissell is a member of various coaching associations including the National Soccer Coaches Association of America (NSCAA), United States Soccer Coaches Organization and the United States Youth Soccer Coaches Connection.
Chris Cissell has served as the chairman of the NAIA Region V Men's Soccer Committee and is currently the chairman of the NAIA Region V Women's Soccer Committee.
Chris Cissell has a USSF National Coaching License.
Chris Cissell conducted a demonstration for coaches during Denis Irwin's visit to Kansas City promoting Manchester United's July 25, 2010 exhibition versus the Kansas City Wizards.

Notable Players Coached

Players who earned All America honors, drafted by a professional team or signed professional contract:

Justin Beck (William Jewell College)-Earned NSCAA/NAIA All America 2nd Team in 2010. Earned ESPN The Magazine Academic All America 3rd Team in 2010. Earned NSCAA Scholar All America 1st Team in 2010.
Toby Crookshanks (William Jewell College)-Earned NAIA All America Honorable Mention honors at William Jewell College in 2002.
Danielle Doerfler (William Jewell College)-Earned NAIA All America Honorable Mention in 2010. Earned NSCAA Scholar All America 3rd Team in 2010.
Shannon Eberle (William Jewell College)-Named NSCAA/adidas NAIA 2nd Team All America in 2007.
Sarah Franklin (William Jewell College)-Named NSCAA/NAIA All America 3rd Team in 2010.
Erica Greco (William Jewell College)-Named NAIA All America Honorable Mention in 2007.
Dusty Green (William Jewell College)-Named NAIA All America Honorable Mention in 2005 and NAIA Academic All America in 2006.
Troy Green (William Jewell College)-Earned NAIA All America Honorable Mention in 2010.
Matt Happy (William Jewell College)-Earned NAIA All America Honorable Mention in 2006.
Josh Howard (William Jewell College)-Earned All Premier Development League 1st Team honors and PDL Defender of the Year Finalist in 2006 with the Kansas City Brass. Earned NSCAA/adidas NAIA All America 2nd Team honors at William Jewell College in 2006. Played with the Kansas City Wizards (MLS) Reserves in 2008. Josh now plays in Sweden with a pro team.
Allison Mallams (William Jewell College)-Earned NSCAA/adisas NAIA 1st Team All America at William Jewell College in 2003 and NAIA All America honors in 2004. Played with United States U23 National Team in 2008.
Kristin Neher (William Jewell College)-Earned NSCAA/adids NAIA All America 2nd Team at William Jewell College in 2001 and 2003. Earned NAIA All America Honorable Mention at William Jewell College in 2002.
Allan Nekuda (William Jewell College)-Earned NSCAA/adidas NAIA 1st Team All America honors in 2006. Drafted in the second round of the 2007 MISL College Draft by the Detroit Ignition. Also played as a guest player with the Kansas City Wizards (MLS) in Argentina and the Kansas City Wizards (MLS) Reserves in official MLS Reserve League games.

Kevin Nekuda (William Jewell College)-Drafted in the first round of the 2008 MISL College Draft by the Orlando Sharks.

Theresa Noll (William Jewell College)-Named NSCAA/adidas NAIA 3rd Team All America in 2007.
Michael Patton (William Jewell College)-Earned NAIA All America Honorable Mention at William Jewell College in 2003 and 2004.
Nicole Revenaugh (William Jewell College)-Named NSCAA/adidas NAIA 1st Team All America in 2007. Named NSCAA/adidas 1st Team Academic All America in 2007.
Blake Ryan (William Jewell College)-Earned NAIA All America Honorable Mention honors at William Jewell College in 2003 and 2004. Drafted in the fifth round of the 2005 MISL College Draft. Also played as a guest player with the Kansas City Wizards (MLS) Reserves and Los Angeles Galaxy (MLS) Reserves.
Manny Tovar (William Jewell College)-Played as a guest player with the Kansas City Wizards (MLS) in an exhibition match 5–0 win vs the University of Evansville on April 3, 2010.
Austin Williams (William Jewell College)-Played as a guest player with the Kansas City Wizards (MLS) in exhibition matches in 2009.

Articles & Interviews
"Get Better With the Ball" by Chris Cissell

"Chris Cissell's 2009 Trip to London" by wjcsoccer.com

Carla Cole interviews William Jewell College head coach Chris Cissell.

Notes

1972 births
American soccer coaches
Living people
William Jewell College alumni